is a railway station in the village of Sekikawa, Niigata Prefecture, Japan, operated by East Japan Railway Company (JR East).

Lines
Echigo-Ōshima Station is served by the Yonesaka Line, and is located 83.5 rail kilometers from the terminus of the line at Yonezawa Station.

Station layout
The station has one ground-level side platform serving a single bi-directional track. The station is unattended.

History
Echigo-Ōshima Station opened on 10 August 1931. The station was absorbed into the JR East network upon the privatization of JNR on 1 April 1987.

Surrounding area

See also
 List of railway stations in Japan

References

External links
 JR East Station information 

Railway stations in Niigata Prefecture
Yonesaka Line
Railway stations in Japan opened in 1931
Sekikawa, Niigata